The Flag of the Treinta y Tres is one of the three official flags of Uruguay, along with the National Flag of Uruguay and the Flag of Artigas. Inspired on the flag of the Oriental Province with an added motto it was first used in 1825 in the military expedition of the Treinta y Tres Orientales meant to free the country from Brazilian occupation. In 1952 it was officialized as a national symbol of Uruguay.

Historical background 

The Flag of the Treinta y Tres pays homage to the military expedition of the Treinta y Tres Orientales, a militant revolutionary group led by Juan Antonio Lavalleja and Manuel Oribe which fought against the Empire of Brazil during the Brazilian occupation of the Provincia Oriental. The flag was first used during the disembarkation of the Thirty-Three Orientals in Uruguayan territory the 19th of April, 1825, at the beginning of the Cisplatine War.

Symbolism and design 

The design features three horizontal stripes: the top stripe, blue, represents greatness; the center one, white, is a symbol of the Republic; and the bottom one, red, honors the blood of those who died for freedom and independence. Uruguay's national motto Libertad o Muerte ("Freedom or Death") reads on the center stripe.

Official standing with other flags 

By law the Flag of the Treinta y Tres must be flown alongside the National Flag and the Flag of Artigas in all government buildings on national holidays.

Historical lost flag 

In 1969, an original surviving flag from the Cisplatine War was stolen by the revolutionary group OPR-33. The flag was taken from the history museum and last seen in 1975, but has been considered missing since February 1969.

References 

Flags of Uruguay
Thirty-Three Orientals